The 2013–14 Mohun Bagan A.C. season is the 124th season of Mohun Bagan A.C. since the club's formation in 1889 and their 17th season in the I-League which is India's top football league. The team finished runners-up in the Calcutta Football League and a dismal eighth in the I-League. Mohun Bagan reached the semi finals of the Federation Cup where they were defeated by Churchill Brothers and they bowed out in the group stage of the IFA Shield.

Transfers

In

Pre-season

Mid-season

Out

Pre-season

Mid-season

Kits
Supplier: Shiv Naresh / Sponsors: McDowell's No.1

Squad

First-team Squad

{| class="wikitable" style="text-align:center; font-size:90%; width:80%"
|-
!style="background:#7A1024; color:white; text-align:center;"|Name
!style="background:#1A5026; color:white; text-align:center;"|Nationality
!style="background:#7A1024; color:white; text-align:center;"|Position
!style="background:#1A5026; color:white; text-align:center;"|Date of Birth (Age)
|-
!colspan=5 style="background:#7a1024; color:white; text-align:center;"|Goalkeepers
|-
|Shilton Pal (vice-captain)
|
|GK
|
|-
|Sandip Nandy 
|
|GK
|
|-
|Monotosh Ghosh 
|
|GK
|
|-
!colspan=5 style="background:#1A5026; color:white; text-align:center;"|Defenders
|-
|Aiborlang Khongjee
|
|DF
|
|-
|Ravinder Singh
|
|DF
|
|-
|Echezona Anyichie
|
|DF
|
|-
|Kingshuk Debnath
|
|DF
|
|-
|Rowilson Rodrigues
|
|DF
|
|-
|Wahid Sali
|
|DF
|
|-
|Pritam Kotal
|
|DF
|
|-
|Shouvik Ghosh
|
|DF
|
|-
|Rana Gharami
|
|DF
|—
|-
!colspan=5 style="background:#7a1024; color:white; text-align:center;"|Midfielders
|-
|Denson Devadas
|
|MF
|
|-
|Adil Khan
|
|MF
|
|-
|Katsumi Yusa 
|
|MF
|
|-
|Ram Malik
|
|MF
|
|-
|Pankaj Moula
|
|MF
|
|-
|Manish Bhargav
|
|MF
|
|-
|Ujjal Howladar
|
|MF
|
|-
|Zakeer Mundampara
|
|MF
|
|-
|Bikramjit Singh
|
|MF
|
|-
|T.Seiboi Haokip
|
|MF
|—
|-
|Adarsh Tamang
|
|MF
|
|-
|Rajib Ghorui
|
|MF
|
|-
|Arghya Chakraborty
|
|MF
|—
|-
|Shaiju Mon
|
|MF
|
|-
|Prayashu Halder
|
|MF
|—
|-
|Abung Meetei
|
|MF
|—
|-
!colspan=5 style="background:#1A5026; color:white; text-align:center;"|Forwards
|-
|Odafa Onyeka Okolie (captain)
|
|FW
|
|-
|Christopher Chizoba 
|
|FW
|
|-
|Chinadorai Sabeeth
|
|FW
|
|-
|Shankar Oraon 
|
|FW
|
|-
|Prakash Roy 
|
|FW
|—
|-

Technical Staff
{| class="wikitable"
|-
! Position
! Name
|-
|Chief coach
| Karim Bencherifa
|-
| Assistant coach
| Mridul Banerjee
|-
| Goalkeeping coach
| Arpan Dey
|-
| Physiotherapist
| Jonathan Corner
|-
| Team manager
| Debasish Dutta

Statistics

Calcutta Football League stats

Last Updated: 11 January 2014Source: Statistics

Goal scorers
{| class="wikitable" style="text-align:center; font-size:95%"
|-
!Pos.
!Nat.
!Name
!Goal(s)
!Appearance(s)
|-
|MF||
|Katsumi Yusa
|5||11
|-
|FW||
|Harrison Muranda
|4||5
|-
|FW||
|Odafa Onyeka Okolie
|3||5
|-
|MF||
|Manish Bhargav
|3||5
|-
|FW||
|Chinadorai Sabeeth
|3||7
|-
|MF||
|Ram Malik
|3||7
|-
|DF||
|Ravinder Singh
|1||2
|-
|MF||
|Adil Khan
|1||4
|-
|MF||
|Zakeer Mundampara
|1||5
|-
|FW||
|Shankar Oraon
|1||8
|-
|MF||
|Denson Devadas
|1||10
|-bgcolor=#efefef
!colspan=3 scope="col"|TOTAL
!scope="col"|
!scope="col"|

Disciplinary record
{| class="wikitable" style="text-align:center; font-size:95%"
!Pos.
!Nat.
!Player
!!!!!
!Notes
|-
|DF
|
|Echezona Anyichie
|2||1||0
|Missed Match: vs Kalighat M.S.(28 December 2013)Missed Match: vs Mohammedan(6 January 2014)
|-
|DF
|
|Aiborlang Khongjee
|3||0||0
|Missed Match: vs Police A.C.(6 October 2013)
|-
|DF
|
|Kingshuk Debnath
|3||0||0
|Missed Match: vs Kalighat M.S.(28 December 2013)
|-
|DF
|
|Adil Khan
|2||0||0
|Missed Match: vs United(17 November 2013)
|-
|DF
|
|Zakeer Mundampara
|2||0||0
|Missed Match: vs Bhawanipore(10 November 2013)
|-
|FW
|
|Shankar Oraon
|1||0||0
|
|-
|MF
|
|Katsumi Yusa
|1||0||0
|
|-
|MF
|
|Adarsh Tamang
|1||0||0
|
|-
|DF
|
|Rowilson Rodrigues
|1||0||0
|
|-
|DF
|
|Wahid Sali
|1||0||0
|
|-
|DF
|
|Nicolau Borges
|1||0||0
|
|-
|GK
|
|Sandip Nandy
|1||0||0
|
|-

I-League stats

Last Updated: 27 April 2014Source: Statistics

Goal scorers
{| class="wikitable" style="text-align:center; font-size:95%"
|-
!Pos.
!Nat.
!Name
!Goal(s)
!Appearance(s)
|-
|FW||
|Odafa Onyeka Okolie
|6
|12
|-
|FW||
|Christopher Chizoba
|5
|13
|-
|FW||
|Chinadorai Sabeeth
|4
|21
|-
|MF||
|Ram Malik
|2
|16
|-
|FW||
|Harrison Muranda
|1
|9
|-
|MF||
|Pankaj Moula
|1
|11
|-
|MF||
|Zakeer Mundampara
|1
|14
|-
|MF||
|Manish Bhargav
|1
|15
|-
|MF||
|Katsumi Yusa
|1
|24
|- bgcolor=#efefef
!colspan=3 scope="col"|TOTAL
!scope="col"|
!scope="col"|

Disciplinary record
{| class="wikitable" style="text-align:center; font-size:95%"
!Pos.
!Nat.
!Player
!!!!!
!Notes
|-
|DF
|
|Echezona Anyichie
|5||2||0
|Missed Match: vs Sporting Goa(19 October 2013)Missed Match: vs East Bengal(24 November 2013)Missed Match: vs United(6 December 2013)
|-
|MF
|
|Denson Devadas
|6||1||0
|Missed Match: vs Mumbai(26 October 2013)Missed Match: vs East Bengal(1 March 2014)
|-
|FW
|
|Shankar Oraon
|1||1||0
|Missed Match: vs Dempo(1 November 2013)
|-
|FW
|
|Christopher Chizoba
|4||0||0
|
|-
|MF
|
|Zakeer Mundampara
|4||0||0
|Missed Match: vs Bengaluru FC(6 April 2014)
|-
|MF
|
|Katsumi Yusa
|3||0||0
|
|-
|MF
|
|Ram Malik
|3||0||0
|
|-
|DF
|
|Kingshuk Debnath
|3||0||0
|
|-
|DF
|
|Aiborlang Khongjee
|3||0||0
|
|-
|DF
|
|Rowilson Rodrigues
|2||0||0
|
|-
|DF
|
|Wahid Sali
|2||0||0
|
|-
|FW
|
|Chinadorai Sabeeth
|1||0||0
|
|-
|MF
|
|Manish Bhargav
|1||0||0
|
|-
|MF
|
|Bikramjit Singh
|1||0||0
|
|-
|DF
|
|Shouvik Ghosh
|1||0||0
|
|-
|DF
|
|Pritam Kotal
|1||0||0
|
|-

Federation Cup stats

Last Updated: 23 January 2014Source: Statistics

Goal scorers
{| class="wikitable" style="text-align:center; font-size:95%"
|-
!Pos.
!Nat.
!Name
!Goal(s)
!Appearances(s)
|-
|FW||
|Odafa Onyeka Okolie
|4
|3
|-
|FW||
|Christopher Chizoba
|3
|4
|-
|MF||
|Ujjal Howladar
|1
|2
|-
|MF||
|Katsumi Yusa
|1
|4
|- bgcolor=#efefef
!colspan=3 scope="col"|TOTAL
!scope="col"|
!scope="col"|

Disciplinary record
{| class="wikitable" style="text-align:center; font-size:95%"
!Pos.
!Nat.
!Player
!!!!!
!Notes
|-
|FW
|
|Christopher Chizoba
|1||0||0
|
|-
|MF
|
|Ujjal Howladar
|1||0||0
|
|-
|MF
|
|Zakeer Mundampara
|1||0||0
|
|-
|DF
|
|Aiborlang Khongjee
|1||0||0
|
|-

IFA Shield stats

Last Updated: 8 February 2014Source: Statistics

Goal scorers
{| class="wikitable" style="text-align:center; font-size:95%"
|-
!Pos.
!Nat.
!Name
!Goal(s)
|-
|FW||
|Chinadorai Sabeeth
|1
|- bgcolor=#efefef
!colspan=3 scope="col"|TOTAL
!scope="col"|

Disciplinary record
{| class="wikitable" style="text-align:center; font-size:95%"
!Pos.
!Nat.
!Player
!!!!!
!Notes
|-
|MF
|
|Ram Malik
|1||0||0
|
|-
|DF
|
|Kingshuk Debnath
|1||0||0
|
|-

Player statistics

Appearances and Goals

Last Updated: 27 April 2014  Apps: (Matches Started)+(Substitute Appearances)

Disciplinary record
{| class="wikitable" style="text-align:center; font-size:95%"
!rowspan="2"|Pos.
!rowspan="2"|Nat.
!rowspan="2"|Player
!colspan="3"|CFL
!colspan="3"|I-League
!colspan="3"|Fed Cup
!colspan="3"|IFA Shield
!colspan="3"|Total
!rowspan="2"|Notes
|-
!!!!!
!!!!!
!!!!!
!!!!!
!!!!!
|-
|DF
|
|Echezona Anyichie
|1||1||0
|3||2||0
|0||0||0
|0||0||0
|4||3||0
|Missed Match: vs Sporting Goa(19 October 2013)Missed Match: vs East Bengal(24 November 2013)Missed Match: vs United(6 December 2013)Missed Match: vs Kalighat M.S.(28 December 2013)Missed Match: vs Mohammedan(6 January 2014)
|-
|MF
|
|Denson Devadas
|0||0||0
|5||1||0
|0||0||0
|0||0||0
|5||1||0
|Missed Match: vs Mumbai(26 October 2013)Missed Match: vs East Bengal(1 March 2014)
|-
|FW
|
|Shankar Oraon
|1||0||0
|0||1||0
|0||0||0
|0||0||0
|1||1||0
|Missed Match: vs Dempo(1 November 2013)
|-
|DF
|
|Aiborlang Khongjee
|3||0||0
|3||0||0
|1||0||0
|0||0||0
|7||0||0
|Missed Match: vs Police A.C.(6 October 2013)
|-
|DF
|
|Kingshuk Debnath
|3||0||0
|3||0||0
|0||0||0
|1||0||0
|7||0||0
|Missed Match: vs Kalighat M.S.(28 December 2013)
|-
|MF
|
|Zakeer Mundampara
|2||0||0
|4||0||0
|1||0||0
|0||0||0
|7||0||0
|Missed Match: vs Bhawanipore(10 November 2013)Missed Match: vs Bengaluru FC(6 April 2014)
|-
|FW
|
|Christopher Chizoba
|0||0||0
|4||0||0
|1||0||0
|0||0||0
|5||0||0
|
|-
|MF
|
|Katsumi Yusa
|1||0||0
|3||0||0
|0||0||0
|0||0||0
|4||0||0
|
|-
|MF
|
|Ram Malik
|0||0||0
|3||0||0
|0||0||0
|1||0||0
|4||0||0
|
|-
|DF
|
|Rowilson Rodrigues
|1||0||0
|2||0||0
|0||0||0
|0||0||0
|3||0||0
|
|-
|DF
|
|Wahid Sali
|1||0||0
|2||0||0
|0||0||0
|0||0||0
|3||0||0
|
|-
|MF
|
|Adil Khan
|2||0||0
|0||0||0
|0||0||0
|0||0||0
|2||0||0
|Missed Match: vs United(17 November 2013)
|-
|FW
|
|Chinadorai Sabeeth
|0||0||0
|1||0||0
|0||0||0
|0||0||0
|1||0||0
|
|-
|MF
|
|Manish Bhargav
|0||0||0
|1||0||0
|0||0||0
|0||0||0
|1||0||0
|
|-
|MF
|
|Ujjal Howladar
|0||0||0
|0||0||0
|1||0||0
|0||0||0
|1||0||0
|
|-
|MF
|
|Bikramjit Singh
|0||0||0
|1||0||0
|0||0||0
|0||0||0
|1||0||0
|
|-
|MF
|
|Adarsh Tamang
|1||0||0
|0||0||0
|0||0||0
|0||0||0
|1||0||0
|
|-
|DF
|
|Pritam Kotal
|0||0||0
|1||0||0
|0||0||0
|0||0||0
|1||0||0
|
|-
|DF
|
|Shouvik Ghosh
|0||0||0
|1||0||0
|0||0||0
|0||0||0
|1||0||0
|
|-
|DF
|
|Nicolau Borges
|1||0||0
|0||0||0
|0||0||0
|0||0||0
|1||0||0
|
|-
|GK
|
|Sandip Nandy
|1||0||0
|0||0||0
|0||0||0
|0||0||0
|1||0||0
|
|-

Competitions

Overall

Last Updated: 28 April 2014Source: Competitions

Overview

Calcutta Football League

I-League

Federation Cup

Group stage (group C)

Semifinals

IFA Shield

Group stage (group B)

Results summary

Matches

Calcutta Football League

I-League

Federation Cup

IFA Shield

References

Mohun Bagan AC seasons
Mohun Bagan